Fiona Alison Brown (born 31 March 1995) is a Scottish footballer who plays as a forward for Damallsvenskan club FC Rosengård and the Scotland national team.

Club career
Brown played four years at Celtic before she joined Glasgow City in December 2013. She scored the 1–1 in the away match against FC Zürich in the 8th Finals of the UEFA Women's Champions League that Glasgow City in the end won on aggregate.

Eskilstuna United DFF (2017)
On 19 December 2016, Brown left Scotland and signed with Damallsvenskan club Eskilstuna United DFF. On 19 February 2017, she made her first appearance for the club against Piteå IF in the Svenska Cupen. On 17 April, she made her league debut and scored the winning goal in a 1–0 victory against Hammarby, and was consequently named player of the match. She finished the season with 3 goals in 22 appearances.

FC Rosengård (2017–present)
On 21 November 2017, Brown joined FC Rosengård. On 10 February 2018, she made her debut in a 3–0 win over Vittsjö GIK in the Svenska Cupen. On 18 February, she scored a hat-trick in a 16–0 victory against Qviding FIF.

International career
Brown has represented Scotland at under-16, under-17 and under-19 levels. On 8 February 2015, she made her senior debut for Scotland in a 4–0 win against Northern Ireland. On 25 October 2017, she scored her first goal in a 5–0 win against Albania.

Career statistics

Scores and results list Scotland's goal tally first.

Honours
Glasgow City
 Scottish Women's Premier League: 2014, 2016
 Scottish Women's Cup: 2014
 Scottish Women's Premier League Cup: 2014, 2015

FC Rosengård
 Svenska Cupen: 2018

References

External links 
 Scottish FA profile
 Fiona Brown at UEFA.com
 
 
 

1995 births
Living people
Scottish women's footballers
Scotland women's international footballers
Celtic F.C. Women players
Glasgow City F.C. players
Footballers from Stirling
Women's association football forwards
Expatriate women's footballers in Sweden
Damallsvenskan players
Scottish expatriate women's footballers
Scottish expatriate sportspeople in Sweden
Eskilstuna United DFF players
FC Rosengård players
2019 FIFA Women's World Cup players
UEFA Women's Euro 2017 players